A third referendum on the Compact of Free Association was held in Palau on 21 February 1986, after the previous two referendums had failed to achieve the 75% in favour necessary. Voters were asked whether they approved of the Compact of Free Association between Palau and the United States signed on 10 January 1986. It was approved by 72.2% of voters, with a turnout of 71.3%.

Results

References

1986 referendums
1986 in Palau
Referendums in Palau